Fairview is an unincorporated community located in Power County, Idaho, United States.

References

Unincorporated communities in Power County, Idaho
Unincorporated communities in Idaho